Alexander Alcock was an Irish Anglican priest.

The son of Alexander Alcock, Dean of Lismore from 1725 until 1747, he was educated at Trinity College, Dublin. He was Archdeacon of Lismore from 1753 until his death in 1787.

Notes

1787 deaths
18th-century Irish Anglican priests
Archdeacons of Lismore
Alumni of Trinity College Dublin